Mbe is a language spoken by the Mbube people of the Ogoja, Cross River State region of Nigeria, numbering about 65,000 people in 2011. As the closest relative of the Ekoid family of the Southern Bantoid languages, Mbe is fairly close to the Bantu languages. It is tonal and has a typical Niger–Congo noun-class system.

Phonology

Vowels 

Consonants 
Mbe has a rather elaborate consonant inventory compared to the Ekoid languages, presumably due to contact from neighbouring Upper Cross River languages.

All Mbe consonants apart from the labial–velars and  have labialised counterparts. ( is presumably .) In addition, the non-labialised peripheral stops (palatalised  would be ) and the liquids have palatalised counterparts.

An interesting additional contrast is between fortis and lenis . This distinction may be being lost. (Blench)

Tone 
Tones are high, low, rising, falling and a downstep; rising and falling may be tone sequences.

References 
 Roger Blench, 'Ekoid' (with Mbe)

External links 
Global Recordings Network: Mbe

Ekoid languages
Languages of Nigeria
Southern Bantoid languages